Fine Gael (English: "Family (or Tribe) of the Irish") is a liberal-conservative and Christian-democratic political party in Ireland. Fine Gael is currently the third-largest party in the Republic of Ireland in terms of members of Dáil Éireann and largest in terms of Irish members of the European Parliament. The party has a membership of 25,000 in 2021. Leo Varadkar succeeded Enda Kenny as party leader on 2 June 2017 and as Taoiseach on 14 June; Kenny had been leader since 2002, and Taoiseach since 2011.

Fine Gael was founded on 8 September 1933 following the merger of its parent party Cumann na nGaedheal, the National Centre Party and the Army Comrades Association. Its origins lie in the struggle for Irish independence and the pro-Treaty side in the Irish Civil War, with the party claiming the legacy of Michael Collins. In its early years, the party was commonly known as Fine Gael – The United Ireland Party, abbreviated UIP, and its official title in its constitution remains Fine Gael (United Ireland).

Fine Gael is generally considered to be more of a proponent of market liberalism than its traditional rival, Fianna Fáil. Fine Gael describes itself as a "party of the progressive centre" which it defines as acting "in a way that is right for Ireland, regardless of dogma or ideology". It lists its core values as "equality of opportunity, free enterprise and reward, security, integrity and hope." In international politics, the party is highly supportive of the European Union, along with generally supporting strengthened relations with the United Kingdom and opposition to physical force Irish republicanism. The party's autonomous youth wing, Young Fine Gael (YFG), was formed in 1977.

Having governed in coalition with the Labour Party between 2011 and 2016, and in a minority government along with Independent TDs from 2016 to 2020, Fine Gael currently forms part of a historic coalition government with its traditional rival, Fianna Fáil, and the Green Party, with Leo Varadkar serving as Taoiseach since December 2022.

History

Foundation

Fine Gael was created in 1933 following the merger of three political organisations; Cumann na nGaedhael (CnaG) led by W. T. Cosgrave, the National Centre Party led by Frank MacDermot and James Dillon, and the National Guard (better known as the Blueshirts), led by fascist Eoin O'Duffy. Cumann na nGaedhael, born out of the pro-Anglo-Irish Treaty side in the Irish Civil War, had been the party of government from the creation of the Irish Free State in 1922 until the 1932 general election, which it lost to the newly emergent Fianna Fáil. The National Centre Party was a new party that had done well at the '32 election, and represented the interests of farmers. The National Guard were not a political party, but a militant group made up of former pro-Treaty Irish Army soldiers, and was previously known as the Army Comrades Association. Following the disruption of Cumann na nGaedhael meetings by members of the Irish Republican Army, the ACA had begun providing security at their events. This led to the leadership of the ACA being taken over by a number of CnaG TDs, including Thomas F. O'Higgins. In early 1933, Eoin O'Duffy took over the ACA, renamed them the National Guard, and began instilling the organisation with elements of European fascism. However, in August 1933 the Fianna Fáil government banned the National Guard, fearing a planned parade in Dublin might be an attempt to emulate the March on Rome.

It was following this, in September 1933, that the three groups combined forces and merged to form Fine Gael. The National Guard (referred to informally by this point as "the Blueshirts") were to serve as the youth wing of the new party, "The League of Youth". In order to not appear as a simple continuation of Cumann na nGaedhael, O'Duffy was made leader of the new party. However, following poor results at the 1934 Irish local elections and increasingly rabid rhetoric, O'Duffy resigned from the leadership after the party attempted to control what he said in public. He was replaced by W.T. Cosgrave, with James Dillon becoming deputy leader. O'Duffy attempted to regain control of the Blueshirts, but was rebuffed by the majority of them, who chose to stay with Fine Gael. Under the stewardship of Cosgrave and Dillon, the party returned to the more traditional conservatism espoused by Cumann na nGaedhael, with the moribund League of Youth disbanded by 1936.

Finding success with coalitions with Labour

Fine Gael remained out of government and at a low ebb for a prolonged period until the aftermath of the 1948 general election, which saw the party form a grand coalition with several other parties in order to oust Fianna Fáil and place Fine Gael member John A. Costello as Taoiseach. The coalition was short-lived but revived again between 1954 and 1957. However, following this stint Fine Gael were once again sent into the political wilderness. The party went through a period of soul-searching during the 1960s, in which a new generation of Fine Gael politicians led by Declan Costello sought to revitalise Fine Gael with new ideas. In what has later been hailed as a landmark moment in Fine Gael history, Costello proposed moving the party to the left in a social democratic direction with a document entitled "Towards a Just Society". The document was adopted as the basis for the party's manifesto for the 1965 Irish general election; however, when the party failed to make headway at the polls the momentum behind the Just Society document wilted and faded.

It was not until leader Liam Cosgrave secured an election pact with the Labour Party that Fine Gael returned to power in 1973. This period also saw Fine Gael becoming increasingly liberal in ethos, particularly under the leadership of Garret FitzGerald who took the reins of the party in 1977; It was during this time that Fine Gael campaigned in a number of referendums: the party supported Irish entry into the European Economic Community, supported dropping the voting age from 21 to 18, and supported a proposal to remove the "special position" of the Roman Catholic Church from the constitution. It was successful in all three of these campaigns. The party also began a liberal approach to the introduction of contraceptives (Birth control) to Ireland, although an attempt by the Fine Gael/Labour coalition to legalise contraceptives in 1974 stumbled after six members of Fine Gael, most prominently then Taoiseach Liam Cosgrave, voted against their own bill.

The arrangement between Fine Gael and Labour proved pleasing to both parties and their election pacts remained throughout the rest of the 1970s and into the 1980s, seeing the pair enter government a number of times together. In 1985, Fine Gael/Labour voted to vastly liberalise access to contraceptives.  That same year FitzGerald signed the Anglo-Irish Agreement with Margaret Thatcher, paving the way to devolved government in Northern Ireland. In 1986 the party campaigned for a Yes in that year's referendum on legalising divorce, but the No side won by a margin of 0.5%.

Decline and rebuilding
The 1980s had proven fruitful electorally for Fine Gael, but the 1990s and early 2000s saw this momentum decline quickly. One of the first signs of this was the party's poor result in the 1990 Irish presidential election, in which their candidate Austin Currie only secured 17% of the initial vote. Although the party was able to form the government between 1994 and 1997 thanks to coalition partners the Labour Party and the Democratic Left, as well as legalise divorce in 1995 after a successful referendum, the party's share of TDs fell from 54 in 1997 to only 31 in the 2002 general election, its second-worst result ever at that point. It was at this point Enda Kenny took over leadership of the party and began the process of rebuilding it. At the 2007 general election Kenny was able to bring Fine Gael back to its 1997 levels with 51 TDs.

Recovery
The collapse of the Celtic Tiger resulted in the post-2008 Irish economic downturn, which threw Ireland not only into economic turmoil but also political upheaval. The 2011 Irish general election saw the governing Fianna Fáil collapse at the polls, while Fine Gael and the Labour Party returned with their best results ever. For the first time in its history, Fine Gael became the largest party in Dáil Eireann. Once more Fine Gael and Labour paired up to form a government, their tenure marked by the difficulty of trying to guide Ireland towards economic recovery. In 2013, a number of Fine Gael parliamentary party members, including Lucinda Creighton, were expelled from the party for defing the party whip on anti-abortion grounds to oppose the Protection of Life During Pregnancy Bill. These members subsequently formed a political party called Renua.

Since 2015

In 2015, the Fine Gael/Labour government held a referendum on the legislation of gay marriage in Ireland. The government campaigned for a yes vote and were successful. Following the 2016 general election, Fine Gael retained control of the government as a minority government, made possible by a confidence and supply agreement with Fianna Fáíl, who agreed to abstain in confidence votes. Enda Kenny resigned as party leader in 2017, and following a leadership contest, Leo Varadkar became his successor as well as Taoiseach. In doing so, Varadkar became one of the first openly LGBT heads of government in the world. In 2018 the Fine Gael government held a referendum on the Eighth Amendment, the provision in the Irish constitution which forbid abortion. The party campaigned to repeal the amendment and were successful.

After the 2020 general election, for the first time in history, Fine Gael entered into a coalition government with its traditional rival Fianna Fáil, as well as the Green Party, with Leo Varadkar serving as Tánaiste for the first half of the government's five year term, then becoming Taoiseach in December 2022.

Ideology and policies

As a political party of the centre-right, Fine Gael has been described as liberal-conservative, Christian-democratic, liberal, conservative liberal, conservative, and pro-European, with an ideological base combining elements of cultural conservatism and economic liberalism.

Although Ireland's political spectrum was traditionally divided along Civil War lines, rather than the traditional European left–right spectrum, Fine Gael is described generally as a centre-right party, with a focus on "fiscal rectitude". As the descendant of the pro-Treaty factions in the Irish Civil War, Fine Gael takes inspiration from Michael Collins and claims his legacy. He remains a symbol for the party, and the anniversary of his death is commemorated each year in August.

Although Fine Gael was historically a Catholic party, it became the de facto home for Irish Protestants. Its membership base had a higher proportion of Protestants than that of Fianna Fáil or Labour. The party promoted a strong Catholic image and depicted itself as a defender of Catholicism against Atheistic Communism, of which it accused the two aforementioned parties of being sympathetic to.

Social policies
Fine Gael adopted the "Just Society" policy statement in the 1960s, based on principles of social justice and equality. It was created by the emerging social democratic wing of the party, led by Declan Costello. The ideas expressed in the policy statement had a significant influence on the party in the years to come.

While Fine Gael was traditionally socially conservative for most of the twentieth century due to the conservative Christian ethos of Irish society during this time, its members are variously influenced by social liberalism, social democracy and Christian democracy on issues of social policy. Under Garret FitzGerald, the party's more socially liberal, or pluralist, wing gained prominence. Proposals to allow divorce were put to referendum by two Fine Gael–led governments, in 1986 under FitzGerald, and in 1995 under John Bruton, passing very narrowly on this second attempt. Its modern supporters have shown a preference for postmaterialist values.

LGBT+ issues

Fine Gael supported civil unions for same-sex couples from 2003, voting for the Civil Partnership and Certain Rights and Obligations of Cohabitants Bill 2010, and the party approved a motion at its 2012 Ardfheis to prioritise the consideration of same-sex marriage in the upcoming constitutional convention. In 2013 party leader and Taoiseach Enda Kenny declared his support for same-sex marriage. The Fine Gael-led government held a referendum on the subject on 22 May 2015. The referendum passed, with the electorate voting to extend full marriage rights to same-sex couples, with 62.1% in favour and 37.9% opposed.

In 2015, months before the marriage equality referendum, Leo Varadkar became the first Irish government minister to come out as gay. In May 2019, former Rose of Tralee Maria Walsh, was elected as a Fine Gael MEP for the Midlands-Northwest constituency in the 2019 European Parliament election, running alongside Mairéad McGuinness MEP. Walsh was Fine Gael's first openly lesbian candidate.

Fine Gael has an LGBT+ section, Fine Gael LGBT, and in 2017, Leo Varadkar became the first Taoiseach to march in Dublin's Pride Parade.

Abortion 
In 1983, having initially supported the proposal, Fine Gael came out in opposition to the Eighth Amendment to the Irish Constitution that was being submitted in a referendum in 1983, which sought to introduce a constitutional prohibition on abortion. Under then leader and Taoiseach Garret FitzGerald it campaigned for a 'No' vote, arguing, on the advice of the Attorney General Peter Sutherland, that the wording, which had been drafted under the previous government, when analysed was ambiguous and open to many interpretations. This referendum resulted in the Eighth Amendment to the Irish constitution, giving the unborn child a qualified equal right to life to that of the mother. Its stance conflicted with that of the Pro-Life Amendment Campaign (PLAC) and Catholic bishops, and Fianna Fáil, the largest party in the State at the time, but then in opposition.

The party also campaigned against the Twenty-fifth Amendment to the Constitution in 2002, which proposed to remove suicide as a grounds for granting a termination of a pregnancy. Suicide had been ruled as a ground, under the 8th amendment, in the X Case judgement of the Irish Supreme Court. The amendment was rejected by Irish voters.

In 2013 it proposed, and supported, the enactment of the Protection of Life During Pregnancy Act 2013, which implemented in statute law the X case ruling of the Irish Supreme Court, granting access to a termination of a pregnancy where there is a real and substantial risk to the life, not the health, of the mother, including a threat of suicide. Five TDs & two Senators, including Minister of State Lucinda Creighton, lost the Fine Gael party whip for voting against the legislation. Creighton later left Fine Gael to found Renua. The Act was criticised by various anti-abortion groups and Catholic bishops, but supported by a majority of the electorate in opinion polls, with many indicating they wished to see a more liberal law on abortion.

Enda Kenny's Fine Gael–led minority government took office after the 2016 election with a programme which promised a randomly selected Citizens' Assembly to report on possible changes to the Eighth Amendment, which would be considered by an Oireachtas committee, to whose report the government would respond officially in debates in both houses of the Oireachtas. Fine Gael Oireachtas members were promised a free vote on the issue. Leo Varadkar succeeded Enda Kenny as Taoiseach on 14 June 2017 and promised to hold a referendum on abortion in 2018. Several Fine Gael TDs, notably Health Minister Simon Harris and Kate O'Connell, were prominent supporters of the pro-choice side before and during the referendum. While the party was divided, the majority of Fine Gael TDs and Senators, as well as most members, were in favour of repealing the Eighth Amendment. A referendum to repeal the Eighth Amendment was held on 25 May 2018 and was passed by 66.4% of voters.

Drug policies 
The party has traditionally held a strong stance against the decriminalisation of drugs. In 2007, Fine Gael's leader at the time Enda Kenny called for drug and alcohol testing to be performed in schools, saying cocaine usage at schools was "rampant" in some areas.

At the party's 2014 Ard Fheis, a proposed motion to support the legalisation of cannabis was voted down by the membership.

In 2016, the Fine Gael health minister James Reilly said that they would not be changing their policy on the legalisation of cannabis, due to "serious concerns about the health impacts" of cannabis.

Economic policies
Fine Gael has, since its inception, portrayed itself as a party of fiscal rectitude and minimal government interference in economics, advocating pro-enterprise policies. In that they followed the line of the previous pro-Treaty government that believed in minimal state intervention, low taxes and social expenditures. Newly elected politicians for the party in the Dáil have strongly advocated liberal economic policies. Lucinda Creighton (who has since left the party) and Leo Varadkar in particular have been seen as strong advocates of a neoliberal approach to Ireland's economic woes and unemployment problems. Varadkar in particular has been a strong proponent of small, indigenous business, advocating that smaller firms should benefit from the government's recapitalisation program. Its former finance spokesman Richard Bruton's proposals have been seen as approaching problems from a pro-enterprise point of view. Its fairer budget website in 2011 suggested that its solutions are "tough but fair". Other solutions conform generally to conservative governments' policies throughout Europe, focusing on cutting numbers in the public sector, while maintaining investment in infrastructure.

Fine Gael's proposals have sometimes been criticised mostly by smaller political groupings in Ireland, and by some of the trade unions, who have raised the idea that the party's solutions are more conscious of business interests than the interests of the worker. The SIPTU trade union has stated its opposition to the Taoiseach Enda Kenny's assertion, in response to Ireland's economic crisis, that the national wage agreement should be suspended. Kenny's comments had support however and the party attributes its significant rise in polls in 2008 to this.

Fine Gael's Simon Coveney launched what the party termed a radical re-organisation of the Irish semi-state company sector. Styled the New Economy and Recovery Authority (or NewERA), Coveney said that it is an economic stimulus plan that will "reshape the Irish economy for the challenges of the 21st century". Requiring an €18.2 billion investment in Energy, Communications and Water infrastructure over a four-year period, it was promoted as a way to enhance energy security and digital reputation of Ireland. A very broad ranging document, it proposed the combined management of a portfolio of semi-state assets, and the sale of all other, non-essential services. The release of equity through the sale of the various state resources, including electricity generation services belonging to the ESB, Bord na Móna and Bord Gáis, in combination with use of money in the National Pensions Reserve Fund, was Fine Gael's proposed funding source for its national stimulus package.

The plan was seen at being the basis of a Fine Gael program for government. Seen as being the longer term contribution to Fine Gael's economic plan, it has been publicised in combination with a more short term policy proposal from Leo Varadkar. This document, termed "Hope for a Lost Generation", promises to bring 30,000 young Irish people off the Live Register in a year by combining a National Internship Program, a Second Chance Education Scheme, an Apprenticeship Guarantee and Community Work Program, as well as instituting a German style, Workshare program.

Constitutional reform policies
The debate which has been monitored by the Irish Times in its Renewing the Republic opinion pieces, has largely centred on the make up of the Oireachtas, the Irish parliament. Fine Gael's Phil Hogan TD, a former European Commissioner, has published the party's proposals for political and constitutional reform. In a policy document entitled New Politics, Hogan suggested creating a country with "a smaller, more dynamic and more responsive political system," reducing the size of the Dáil by 20, changing the way the Dáil works, and in a controversial move, abolishing the Irish senate, Seanad Éireann.

Aiming to carry out the parties proposals through a series of constitutional referendums, the proposals were echoed by then Labour leader Eamon Gilmore, when he proposed his own constitutional "crusade" at his 2010 party conference, shortly after.

Health policies

The Irish health system, being administered centrally by the Health Service Executive, is seen to be poor by comparison to other countries in Europe, ranking outside expected levels at 25th according to the Euro Health Consumer Index 2006.

Fine Gael has long wanted Ireland to break with the system of private health insurance, public medical cards and what it calls the two tiers of the health system and has launched a campaign to see the system reformed. Speaking in favour of the campaign, Fine Gael then health spokesman James Reilly stated "Over the last 10 years the health service has become a shambles. We regularly have over 350 people on trolleys in A&E, waiting lists that go on for months, outpatient waiting lists that go on for years and cancelled operations across the country..."

Fine Gael launched its FairCare campaign and website in April 2009, which stated that the health service would be reformed away from a costly ineffective endeavour, into a publicly regulated system where compulsory universal health insurance would replace the existing provisions.

This strategy was criticised by Fianna Fáil's then-Minister for Children, Barry Andrews. The spokesperson for family law and children, Alan Shatter TD, robustly defended its proposals as the only means of reducing public expenditure, and providing a service in Ireland more akin to the Canadian, German, Dutch and Austrian health systems.

Fine Gael's current healthcare policy revolves around the implementation of Sláintecare, a cross-party plan for the reform of the Irish health system. Sláintecare is focused on introducing "a universal single-tiered health service, which guarantees access based on need, not income… through Universal Health Insurance".

Pro-Europeanism and defence policies
Fine Gael is among the most pro-European integration parties in Ireland, having supported the European Constitution, the Lisbon Treaty, and advocating participation in European common defence. The party have been supportive of NATO. In 1998, party leader John Bruton called on Ireland to join the NATO-led Partnership for Peace. The party's youth wing, Young Fine Gael, passed a motion in 2016 calling on the government to apply for membership of NATO.

Under Enda Kenny, the party called on the state to end Irish neutrality and to sign up for a European defence structure, with Kenny claiming that "the truth is, Ireland is not neutral. We are merely unaligned." Following the 2022 Russian invasion of Ukraine, Fine Gael called for an increase in defence spending, with Minister for Foreign Affairs Simon Coveney proposing an increase of €500 million a year and suggesting Ireland needed a "fundamental rethink" of its security approach.

Since Brexit, Fine Gael has taken a strong pro-European stance, stating that Ireland's place is "at the heart of Europe". In government, the party has launched the "Global Ireland" plan to develop alliances with other small countries across Europe and the world.

European affiliations
Fine Gael is a founding member of the European People's Party (EPP), the largest European political party comprising liberal conservative and Christian democratic national-level parties from across Europe. Fine Gael's MEPs sit with the EPP Group in the European Parliament, and Fine Gael parliamentarians also sit with the EPP Groups in the Parliamentary Assembly of the Council of Europe and Committee of the Regions. Young Fine Gael is a member of the Youth of the European People's Party (YEPP).

It is inferred from the party's relationship with its European counterparts via membership of the European People's Party that Fine Gael belongs on the centre-right. The party conforms generally with European political parties that identify themselves as being Christian democratic.

Planning and payment tribunals
The Moriarty Tribunal has sat since 1997 and has investigated the granting of a mobile phone license to Esat Telecom by Michael Lowry when he was Fine Gael Minister for Transport, Energy and Communications in the Rainbow Coalition of the mid-1990s. Lowry resigned from the Cabinet after it was revealed at the Moriarty Tribunal that businessman Ben Dunne had paid for an IR£395,000 extension to Lowry's County Tipperary home. Lowry, now an independent TD, supported the Fianna Fáil–Green Party government in Dáil Éireann until March 2011.

It was also revealed in December 1996 that Fine Gael had received some £180,000 from Ben Dunne in the period 1987 to 1993. This was composed of £100,000 in 1993, £50,000 in 1992 and £30,000 in 1989. In addition, Michael Noonan received £3,000 in 1992 towards his election campaign, Ivan Yates received £5,000, Michael Lowry received £5,000 and Sean Barrett received £1,000 in the earlier 1987 election. John Bruton said he had received £1,000 from Dunne in 1982 towards his election campaign, and Dunne had also given £15,000 to the Labour Party during the 1990 Presidential election campaign.

Following revelations at the Moriarty Tribunal on 16 February 1999, in relation to Charles Haughey and his relationship with AIB, former Taoiseach Garret Fitzgerald confirmed that AIB and Ansbacher wrote off debts of almost £200,000 that he owed in 1993, when he was in financial difficulties because of the collapse of the aircraft leasing company, GPA, in which he was a shareholder. The write-off occurred after Fitzgerald left politics. Fitzgerald also said he believed his then Fine Gael colleague, Peter Sutherland, who was chairman of AIB at the time, was unaware of the situation.

Leadership
The current leader of the Fine Gael party is Leo Varadkar, who, as well as being Ireland's youngest ever Taoiseach is the country's first openly gay leader. The position of deputy leader has been held since 2017 by Simon Coveney TD, the Minister for Foreign Affairs and Defence.

Party leader

The following are the terms of office as party leader, and as Taoiseach (bolded) if applicable:

Deputy leader

Seanad leader

Electoral results

Dáil Éireann

European Parliament

Electoral performance since 2009
In the 2009 local elections held on 5 June 2009, Fine Gael won 556 seats, surpassing Fianna Fáil which won 407 seats, and making Fine Gael the largest party of local government nationally. They gained 88 seats from their 2004 result.

In the 2009 European Parliament election held on the same day as the local elections, which saw a reduction in the number seats from 13 to 12 for Ireland, the party won four seats, retaining the largest number of seats of an Irish party in the European Parliament. This was a loss of one seat from its 2004 result.

In the 2011 general election, Fine Gael gained 25 seats bringing them to a total of 76. The party ran candidates in all 43 constituencies and had candidates elected in every constituency except Dublin North-West. Fine Gael won 19 seats in Seanad Éireann following the 2011 election, a gain of four from the previous election in 2007.

While Fine Gael was responsible for the initial nomination of the uncontested, first President of Ireland, Douglas Hyde, a Fine Gael candidate has never won an election to the office of president. The Fine Gael presidential candidate, Gay Mitchell, finished fourth in the 2011 presidential election, with 6.4% of the vote. In 2004, Fine Gael supported the re-election of President Mary McAleese. Similarly, it supported the re-election of Michael D. Higgins in the 2018 presidential election.

In the 2016 general election the outgoing government consisting of Fine Gael and its partner the Labour Party was defeated. The previous government had the largest majority in the history of the state with a combined 113 seats out of the 166-seat Dáil Éireann. The aftermath of the general election resulted in months of negotiations for an agreement of government. A deal was reached with the main opposition and traditional rival Fianna Fáil to facilitate a minority Fine Gael-led government. Fine Gael governed Ireland alone with eight Independent members of the Dáil until 2020, when the party emerged as the third party following the general election. After governing for several months in a caretaker capacity, Fine Gael agreed to serve in a historic coalition government along with its traditional rival, Fianna Fáil, and the Green Party, with Fianna Fáil leader Micheál Martin serving as Taoiseach and Leo Varadkar serving as Tánaiste. Under the agreed Programme for Government, the role of Taoiseach will rotate to Leo Varadkar in 2022.

Front bench

Young Fine Gael

Young Fine Gael (YFG) is the autonomous youth movement of Fine Gael. It was founded in 1976 by the then leader Garret FitzGerald. It caters for young people under 35 with an interest in Fine Gael and politics, in cities, towns and third level colleges throughout Ireland. YFG is led by its national executive consisting of ten members elected on a regional basis, and on a national panel.

See also
List of political parties in the Republic of Ireland

Notes

References

Bibliography
 Nealon's Guide to the 29th Dáil and Seanad (Gill and Macmillan, 2002)
 Stephen Collins, "The Cosgrave Legacy" (Blackwater, 1996)
 Garret FitzGerald, "Garret FitzGerald: An Autobiography" (Gill and Macmillan, 1991)
 Jack Jones, In Your Opinion: Political and Social Trends in Ireland through the Eyes of the Electorate (Townhouse, 2001)
 Maurice Manning, James Dillon: A Biography (Wolfhound, 1999–2000)
 Stephen O'Byrnes, Hiding Behind a Face: Fine Gael under FitzGerald (Gill and Macmillan: 1986)
 Raymond Smith, Garret: The Enigma (Aherlow, 1985) (no ISBN)

External links

 
 Young Fine Gael

 
Christian democratic parties in Europe
Conservative parties in Ireland
Member parties of the European People's Party
Parties represented in the European Parliament
Political parties established in 1933
Political parties in the Republic of Ireland
1933 establishments in Ireland
Pro-European political parties in Ireland